Events in the year 1974 in Argentina.

Incumbents
President: Juan Peron until July 1, Isabel Perón
Vice President: Isabel Perón until July 1, then vacant

Governors
Buenos Aires Province: Oscar Bidegain (until 24 January); Victorio Calabró (from 24 January)
Cordoba: Ricardo Obregón Cano 
Chubut Province: Benito Fernández
Mendoza Province: 
 until 6 June: Alberto Martínez Baca 
 6 June-13 August: Carlos Mendoza
 from 13 August: Antonio Cafiero
 Santa Fe Province: Carlos Sylvestre Begnis

Vice Governors
 Buenos Aires Province: Victorio Calabró (until 24 January); vacant thereafter (starting 24 January)

Events
May 1 - Expulsion of Montoneros from Plaza de Mayo

Births
 30 January – Sebastián Rambert, footballer
 1 March – Guillermo Morigi, football left winger
 4 March – Ariel Ortega, footballer
 1 April – Hugo Ibarra, football right back
 10 April – Andrés Guglielminpietro, football midfielder
 13 April – Pablo Cavallero, football goalkeeper
 29 May – Fernando Pandolfi, footballer
 17 July – Claudio López, footballer
 30 July – Hugo Morales, football midfielder
 31 July – Eduardo Tuzzio, footballer
 4 August – Kily González, football winger
 2 September – Hugo Pablo Centurión, footballer
 10 October – Julio Ricardo Cruz, football forward
 20 November – Claudio Husaín, football midfielder

Deaths
July 1 - Juan Peron
October 27 - Jordán Bruno Genta

See also
List of Argentine films of 1974

 
1970s in Argentina